Toechima is a genus of small to medium-sized trees in the plant family Sapindaceae. The species are native to New South Wales, the Northern Territory and Queensland in Australia as well as New Guinea.

Species
Eight species (including one undescribed) recognised by the Australian Plant Census and by the Census of Vascular Plants of Papua New Guinea are:
Toechima daemelianum (F.Muell.) Radlk.
Toechima dasyrrhache Radlk. - blunt-leaved steelwood
Toechima erythrocarpum (F.Muell.) Radlk. - pink tamarind, foambark
Toechima erythrocarpum subsp. papuanum P.W.Leenhouts
Toechima livescens Radlk
Toechima monticola S.T.Reynolds
Toechima pterocarpum S.T.Reynolds
Toechima sp. East Alligator (J.Russell-Smith 8418) NT Herbarium
Toechima tenax (Benth.) Radlk.

References

External links

 
Sapindaceae genera
Sapindales of Australia
Taxa named by Ludwig Adolph Timotheus Radlkofer